A Kid from Tibet is a 1992 Hong Kong martial arts-action film directed by and starring Yuen Biao. The film features two more former members of the Seven Little Fortunes: Yuen Wah as an evil sorcerer and a cameo appearance from Jackie Chan. A Kid From Tibet is the only film to date that Yuen has directed (though he also had a co-directing credit on 1988's manga series: Peacock King). It was filmed in Taiwan, Hong Kong and partly on location in Tibet.

Plot
When the evil "Black Section of Esoteric Buddhism" had tried to invade Tibet years ago, the Tibetan monks used a powerful magical item, the "Babu Gold Bottle" to expel them. The Tibetan master (Wu Ma) has the bottle's cap and wishes to reunite it with the bottle as the Black Section are stirring once more. He sends a young monk, Wong La (Yuen Biao) to Hong Kong to recover the sacred bottle, which is in the possession of a crippled lawyer.

Wong meets and protects a woman, Chiu Seng-Neng (Michelle Reis) who is acting as the agent for the lawyer, and the Black Section fight to gain the magical bottle for themselves.

The leader of the Black Section (Yuen Wah) learns of the intended hand-over, and seeks to get the Babu Gold Bottle for himself.

Cast
 Yuen Biao as Lo Ba Wong La
 Michelle Reis as Chiu Seng-neng
 Yuen Wah as Black Section Sorcerer
 Nina Li Chi as Sorcerer's Sister
 Roy Chiao as Lawyer Robinson
 Michael Dingo as Michael
 Wu Ma as Wong's Master
 Billy Lau as Airport Security Guard / Jail Warden 
 Lau Chau-sang (Fung Lee) as Tibetan henchman
 Lay Kah as Tibetan henchman 
 Jackie Chan as Airport Passenger
 Kingdom Yuen as Mimi
 Gabriel Wong as Mimi's lover
 Anthony Carpio as Black Section Sorcerer's Henchman
 Jack Wong
 Corey Yuen
 Lee Ming-yeung as Mr. Bao
 Bruce Law

See also
 List of Hong Kong films
Jackie Chan filmography

External links
 
 

1992 films
1992 action films
1992 martial arts films
Hong Kong action films
Hong Kong martial arts films
1990s Cantonese-language films
Films set in Hong Kong
Films shot in Hong Kong
1992 directorial debut films
1990s Hong Kong films